Kanattukara is a ward and residential area in Thrissur, Kerala, India. It is home to the Sankarankulangara Bhagavathy Temple. There is an annual festival (Vela) celebrated in the temple. There is also a college, the Sree Kerala Varma College.

References

Suburbs of Thrissur city